Workers' College was an affiliated college of Yangon University. The college, located in Botataung in eastern Yangon, offered undergraduate programs in liberal arts, sciences and law mostly to part-time students. Since 2004, the campus of Workers' College has been turned into the newly created National Management University of Myanmar.

History
The college was formerly established as the University for Adult Education in 1948 to 1964 and later changed to University for the Aged, as an affiliated college of Yangon University in 1964 to 1974. It was renamed Workers' College in 1974 to 1980.

Programs
Workers' College offered undergraduate degree programs leading to Bachelor of Arts (BA), Bachelor of Science (BSc), and Bachelor of Laws (LLB).

Administration
 Department of Botany
 Department of Burmese
 Department of Chemistry
 Department of English
 Department of Geography
 Department of History
 Department of Law
 Department of Mathematics
 Department of Philosophy
 Department of Physics
 Department of Psychology
 Department of Zoology

Campus
 Administrative Building
 Convocation Hall
 Laboratory Building

Notable alumni
 Aung Kyi, Major-General (Retd.), Minister for Labour Affairs ( Oct 2007-  )

References

External links
MOE (Ministry of Education)

Universities and colleges in Yangon
Arts and Science universities in Myanmar
Educational institutions established in 1964
1964 establishments in Burma